Đinh Tiến Thành (born 24 January 1991), is a Vietnamese professional footballer for Thanh Hóa as a defender and a member of the Vietnam national team.

He started his career in Vissai Ninh Bình moving in 2012 to Hải Phòng.	

In 2014, he was selected for Vietnam. He represented Vietnam U23 in the 2013 Southeast Asian Games.

Honours

Club
Đông Á Thanh Hóa
Vietnamese National Cup:
 Third place : 2022

International
Vietnam
AFF Championship
Semi-finalists : 2014, 2016
 AYA Bank Cup 
 Winners :: 2016

International goals
Scores and results list Vietnam's goal tally first.

References 

1991 births
Living people
People from Ninh Bình province
Vietnamese footballers
Haiphong FC players
Can Tho FC players
Thanh Hóa FC players
V.League 1 players
Vietnam international footballers
Association football central defenders